Leyendas may refer to:
 Leyendas (franchise), an animated horror-comedy film franchise
 Leyendas (convention), a fantasy and science fiction convention, held annually in Rosario, Argentina

See also
 Legend Quest (2017 TV series), released in Latin America as Las Leyendas, a Mexican animated fantasy comedy-horror television series